The 2011 Individual Speedway World Championship Grand Prix Qualification were a series of motorcycle speedway meetings used to determine the three riders who qualified for the 2011 Speedway Grand Prix. The top eight riders finishing the 2010 Grand Prix series automatically qualified for 2011. The final round of qualification – the Grand Prix Challenge – took place on 21 August 2010, in Vojens, Denmark.

Artem Laguta and Antonio Lindbäck finished in the top two positions, and thus automatically qualified for the 2011 Speedway Grand Prix season. The third spot was decided in a three-way run-off, with Fredrik Lindgren defeating Janusz Kołodziej and Magnus Zetterström.

Qualifying rounds

Race-offs

Grand Prix Challenge 
21 August 2010
 Vojens, Region of Southern Denmark
Vojens Speedway Center (Length: 300 m)
Referee:  Craig Ackroyd
Jury President:  Andrzej Grodzki
References

See also 
 2011 Speedway Grand Prix

References 

2011

World Individual